The Plastics Industry Association, abbreviated as PLASTICS, is a trade association representing the plastics industry. Founded in 1937 as the Society of the Plastics Industry, Inc., the organization rebranded as the Plastics Industry Association, and PLASTICS for short, in 2016.

Membership 
Membership in PLASTICS is divided into four different industry councils, each one representing a different segment of the plastics industry:

 Materials Suppliers
 Processors
 Equipment Manufacturers and Moldmakers
 Brand Owners

The organization also hosts international plastics showcase NPE, among largest triennial trade show for the global plastics industry.

References

External links 
 

Plastics industry organizations
Recycling organizations
Trade associations based in the United States
Advocacy groups in the United States